Echidnodes is a genus of fungi in the Asterinaceae family. The relationship of this taxon to other taxa within the class is unknown (incertae sedis), and it has not yet been placed with certainty into any order.

Species
As accepted by Species Fungorum;

 Echidnodes africana 
 Echidnodes anisocarpa 
 Echidnodes asterinearum 
 Echidnodes bromeliacearum 
 Echidnodes bromeliae 
 Echidnodes cocoes 
 Echidnodes curtisiae 
 Echidnodes denigrata 
 Echidnodes diospyri 
 Echidnodes glonioides 
 Echidnodes hypolepidis 
 Echidnodes hypophylla 
 Echidnodes lembosioides 
 Echidnodes liturae 
 Echidnodes mammeae 
 Echidnodes marcgraviae 
 Echidnodes microspora 
 Echidnodes myrtaceicola 
 Echidnodes pandanicola 
 Echidnodes patula 
 Echidnodes pisoniae 
 Echidnodes sandwicensis 
 Echidnodes serpens 
 Echidnodes sydowii 
 Echidnodes tenompokensis 
 Echidnodes transvaalensis 
 Echidnodes visci 
 Echidnodes vrieseae 
 Echidnodes xenospila 

Former species;
 E. acokantherae  = Lembosina acokantherae, Lembosinaceae family
 E. aulographoides  = Lembosina aulographoides, Lembosinaceae
 E. baccharidincola  = Prillieuxina baccharidincola, Asterinaceae
 E. bosciae  = Lembosina bosciae, Lembosinaceae
 E. canthii  = Lembosina canthii, Lembosinaceae
 E. capparis  = Lembosia capparis, Asterinaceae
 E. crustacea  = Echidnodella crustacea, Asterinaceae
 E. durbana  = Lembosina durbana, Lembosinaceae
 E. embeliae  = Lembosina embeliae, Lembosinaceae
 E. festucae  = Morenoina festucae, Asterinaceae
 E. harunganae  = Lembosia harunganae, Asterinaceae
 E. heptapleuri  = Lembosina heptapleuri, Lembosinaceae
 E. irregularis  = Cirsosia irregularis, Asterinaceae
 E. natalensis  = Echidnodella natalensis, Asterinaceae
 E. pandani  = Lembosia pandani, Asterinaceae
 E. psychotriae  = Lembosina psychotriae, Lembosinaceae
 E. quercina  = Lembosina quercina, Lembosinaceae
 E. quercina var. burmensis  = Lembosina quercina, Lembosinaceae
 E. pittospori  = Lembosina pittospori, Lembosinaceae
 E. rhoina  = Lembosina rhoina, Lembosinaceae
 E. sclerolobii  = Lembosina sclerolobii, Lembosinaceae
 E. tecleae  = Asterinella tecleae, Microthyriaceae
 E. tecleae  = Asterinella tecleae, Microthyriaceae

References

External links
Index Fungorum

Asterinaceae